Annie Stebler-Hopf (1861 – 1918) also known as Anny or Anna Hopf, was a Swiss born painter.

Career 
Hopf was born on 4 September 1861 in Bern, Switzerland. She trained under the German painter Karl Gussow in Berlin. She became a professor at the Berlin Arts Academy between 1876 and 1881. Hopf moved to Paris in 1882 to continue her training. She took classes at the Académie Julian during her stay in Paris, studying under Luc-Olivier Merson and Tony Robert-Fleury, and  exhibiting at the Salon on multiple occasions. Hopf likely left Paris for Zurich in 1890.

Personal life 
Hopf lived with the painter Ottilie Roederstein during her time in Paris at 77 rue Notre-Dame de Champs. She died on 30 January 1918 in Zürich.

Collections 
 Kunstmuseum Bern, Switzerland

Known works 
 Autopsy (Professor Poirier, Paris), 1889, Oil on canvas, 134 x 142 cm, in the collection of Kunstmuseum Bern, Switzerland.

Exhibitions 
 Women Artists in Paris: 1850 – 1900, curated by the American Federation of Arts, Denver Art Museum (2017 – 2018), Speed Art Museum (2018), Clark Art Institute (2018)

References 

1861 births
1918 deaths
Members of the Academy of Arts, Berlin
Swiss women painters